Shashwati Talukdar is an India-born academic-filmmaker based in New York City, with more than twelve films and videos to her name, and who has become well known on the international film-making stage, particularly for her documentaries on cultural identity and representation.

Her work has appeared at the Margaret Mead Film Festival, Mediopolis-Berlin, the Whitney Biennial, Kiasma Museum of Art in Helsinki and the Institute of Contemporary Art, Philadelphia and has gained the support of Jerome Foundation, New York State Council on the Arts and Pennsylvania Council on the Arts. In 2002, Talukdar received the James T. Yee Mentorship Award from the Center for Asian American Media, and, then, in 2003, she received the Project Involve Fellowship from IFP/New York.

Early life
Talukdar was born in Dehradun, Uttarakhand, India. to the esteemed S.N Talukdar and artist Monica Talukdar. She is the youngest of three siblings, with Rudranath, her older brother, and Indrani, her older sister.   She attended Lady Shri Ram College, Delhi University, and Jamia Millia Islamia University in New Delhi, where she obtained a graduate degree in Mass Communication.  She also attended Temple University in Philadelphia, Pennsylvania, for a Masters of Fine Arts in film and media arts.  Since then, she has taught at NYU, Arcadia University and Temple University.

Career
She began her career in 1999 as an assistant editor for BBC's television show, Michael Moore Live.  Since then, she has worked on other projects for BBC as well as for HBO, Lifetime, Sundance and Cablevision.  She runs the production company "Four Nine and Half Pictures," named because Talukdar herself is less than five feet tall.  Additionally, she maintains Shashwati's Blog, which she uses to communicate with fans and other bloggers about various topics, including films, culture and social justice issues. Her film Please Don't Beat Me, Sir, tells the story of the Budhan Theatre, a theatre group composed of members of India's Chhara denotified or "criminal" tribe. She is currently living and working in Taiwan with her husband Kerim.

Filmography
Any Number You Want
Eunuch Alley
Geometry Lover
Mahasweta Devi
My Life as a Poster
RetroAction
Unable to(Re)member Roop Kanwar
Rumination and Advice from Dr. Abbey
Snake-Byte
Tahini and Tears
Bollywood Terror
Please Don't Beat Me, Sir!

See also
 List of Indian documentary filmmakers

References

External links
 
 

Year of birth missing (living people)
Living people
Indian documentary filmmakers
Indian emigrants to the United States
Jamia Millia Islamia alumni
Artists from Dehradun
Delhi University alumni
Temple University alumni
Temple University faculty
American film directors of Indian descent
American women journalists
American writers of Indian descent
Film directors from Uttarakhand
Women documentary filmmakers
American expatriates in Taiwan
Indian expatriates in Taiwan
American women academics
21st-century American women